Émile van Marcke, born Charles Émile van Marcke de Lummen (15 August 1827, Sèvres – 24 December 1890, Hyeres), was a French cattle painter.

Biography
He studied under Troyon at Barbizon. He received the cross of the Legion of Honor in 1872 and a gold medal at the Paris exhibition. He is represented at the Louvre and other museums of France, and at the Metropolitan Museum in New York, The John and Mable Ringling Museum of Art in Sarasota, Florida, and in other public and private collections in the United States. Typical of his work is the public domain image Summer Pastoral, Bresle Valley on this page reproduced courtesy of the Morton Collection. This gem-like work offers the favorite themes of van Marcke in a microcosm; it incorporates cattle, water, reflections, dramatic cloudscapes and a feeling of life and motion and verdant nature. Nature is idyllic and animals emblematic of that harmony.

References

External links

1827 births
1891 deaths
People from Sèvres
19th-century French painters
French male painters
Animal artists
French landscape painters
19th-century French male artists